Daphnella mazatlanica is a species of sea snail, a marine gastropod mollusk in the family Raphitomidae.

Description
The length of the shell varies between 7 mm and 15 mm.

Distribution
This marine species occurs from  the Gulf of California to Ecuador; also off the Galapagos Islands.

References

 Pilsbry, Henry Augustus, and Herbert N. Lowe. "West Mexican and Central American mollusks collected by HN Lowe, 1929-31." Proceedings of the Academy of Natural Sciences of Philadelphia (1932): 33-144.

External links
 
 Gastropods.com: Daphnella mazatlanica

mazatlanica
Gastropods described in 1932